Pelli Sandadi is a 1959 Indian Telugu-language comedy film, produced by Sitaram under the Republic Productions banner and directed by D. Yoganand. It stars Akkineni Nageswara Rao, Anjali Devi and B. Saroja Devi, with music composed by Ghantasala.

Plot 
Captain Kota (Gummadi) retired army officer, lives in the village of Vimala Puram. He leads a happy life with his two daughters Anuradha (Anjali Devi) & Priyamvada (B. Saroja Devi) and his younger brother Janardhan / Dhan (Ramana Reddy). But a thing that suffers him is Veeraiah (R. Nageswara Rao) a drunkard who always blackmails him for money. Once Kota & Dhan arrange a dance performance of their daughters in the town to raise the funds with false names Angla-Pingla. Gurunatham (Chalam) son of Raobahadoor Gangadharam (C.S.R.) visits that dance program and falls in love with younger girl Priyamwada. To rid of it, they invite him to tea, and by that time, they leave back. Retired Subedar Anjaneyulu (Dr. Sivaramakrishnaiah) friend of Raobahadoor brings the alliance of Kota's daughters to Gurunatham. Without knowing the reality Gurunatham sends his friend Vasu (Akkineni Nageswara Rao) to Vimala Puram instead of him. After reaching the village, Vasu falls in love with Anuradha. Unfortunately, he struck up for days together, and here Gurunatham is undergoing many troubles. Uma (Surabhi Balasaraswati) daughter of Anjaneyulu learns about Vasu & Gurunatham's plan and she tries to help them. After some time, Kota calls Raobahadoor to fix up the match. Knowing this Uma gives a telegram to Vasu and also tells Gurunatham that seeing the telegram Vasu will return. So, he goes back home when Vasu is trying to escape he is wounded. Anuradha notices and hides him in her room. After arriving Raobahadoor hears that his son has already left, so, he too moves back and immediately Vasu enters the house.

After reaching home, Raobahadoor receives a telegram from Dhan that Gurunatham is back, confused Raobahadoor again visits Vimala Puram to clarify. Knowing about this, Gurunatham rushes to Vimala Puram till then Vasu cleverly escapes. Raobahadoor & Kota go into an argument regarding Gurunatham's presence and Raobahadoor leaves the place. On the other side, Gurunatham secretly enters Kota's bungalow, they suspect him a thief and lock him in a room but he claims himself as the son of Raobahadoor. Here Kota & Dhan realises something is fishy, so, to find out the truth Dhan silently settles at Anjaneyulu's house where he falls in love with Uma. Eventually, Priya starts liking Gurunatham arrested in their house. Meanwhile, once Priya observes Veeraiah blackmailing Kota, she lures him and knows the secret behind it. Anuradha is Kota's sister's daughter, who married Veeraiah, struggled with him, and before dying she handed over her child to her brother. After that, Anuradha witnesses Priya's closeness with Gurunatham and slaps her. In that anger, she reveals her birth secret when Anuradha becomes distressed. Parallelly, another twist Vasu is the son of Kaasipatnam Zamindar (Rajanala) who is living in exile for 1 year as their family rule. Now Zamindar gives a paper advertisement in the newspaper telling Vasu to come back, as well as, Raobahadoor also gives a paper advertisement regarding Gurunatham. Simultaneously, Dhan catches Vasu and both of them move to Vimala Puram. On the way, Dhan reads the ads, gives telegrams to both, and all of them reach Vimala Puram. At last, all the misunderstandings and confusion are removed. Finally, the movie ends on a happy note with the marriages of Vasu & Anuradha, Gurunatham & Priyamvada, and Dhan & Uma.

Cast 

Akkineni Nageswara Rao as Vasu / Mr. Nath
Anjali Devi as Anuradha
B. Saroja Devi as Priyamvada
Chalam as Gurunatham
Gummadi as Captain Kota
Ramana Reddy as Janardhan
C.S.R. as Raobahadoor Gangadharam
Hemalatha as Gangadharam's wife
Surabhi Balasaraswati as Uma
Rajanala as Kaali Paata Zamindar
R. Nageswara Rao as Veeraiah
Kanta Rao as Doctor
Dr. Sivaramakrishnaiah as Anjaneyulu
Chadalavada as Editor
Peketi Sivaram as Prof. Royya

Soundtrack 
Music composed by Ghantasala. Lyrics were written by Samudrala Jr.

References

External links 
 

,

1950s Telugu-language films
Films directed by D. Yoganand
1959 comedy films
Films scored by Ghantasala (musician)
Indian comedy films